The 1906 Paris–Tours was the third edition of the Paris–Tours cycle race and was held on 30 September 1906. The race started in Paris and finished in Tours. The race was won by Lucien Petit-Breton.

General classification

References

1906 in French sport
1906